Hakim Djamel Abdallah (born 9 January 1998) is a professional footballer who plays as a forward for Belgian club Virton. Born in France, he represents the Madagascar national team.

International career
Abdallah was born in the French overseas territory of Réunion to a Comorian father and Malagasy mother. He debuted for the Madagascar national team in a friendly 2–1 loss to Burkina Faso on 11 October 2020.

References

External links
 
 FFF Profile
 Madagascar Football Profile

1998 births
Footballers from Réunion
Malagasy Muslims
Black French sportspeople
Malagasy people of Comorian descent
Sportspeople of Comorian descent
French sportspeople of Malagasy descent
French sportspeople of Comorian descent
Living people
People with acquired Malagasy citizenship
Malagasy footballers
Madagascar international footballers
French footballers
France youth international footballers
Association football forwards
Stade Brestois 29 players
Stoke City F.C. players
US Avranches players
FC Nantes players
FC Swift Hesperange players
Lierse Kempenzonen players
R.E. Virton players
Championnat National 2 players
Championnat National 3 players
Segunda División B players
Luxembourg National Division players
Challenger Pro League players
Malagasy expatriate footballers
French expatriate footballers
Expatriate footballers in England
French expatriate sportspeople in England
Malagasy expatriate sportspeople in England
Expatriate footballers in Spain
French expatriate sportspeople in Spain
Malagasy expatriate sportspeople in Spain
Expatriate footballers in Luxembourg
French expatriate sportspeople in Luxembourg
Malagasy expatriate sportspeople in Luxembourg
Expatriate footballers in Belgium
French expatriate sportspeople in Belgium
Malagasy expatriate sportspeople in Belgium